The Central District of Aliabad County is a district (bakhsh) in Aliabad County, Golestan Province, Iran. At the 2006 census, its population was 89,204, in 21,632 families.  The District has three cities: Aliabad-e Katul, Sangdevin & Mazraeh.  The District has two rural districts (dehestan): Katul Rural District and Zarrin Gol Rural District.

References 

Districts of Golestan Province
Aliabad County